Saicinae is a subfamily of the family Reduviidae, or the assassin bugs.

Genera
 Bagriella McAtee & Malloch, 1923
 Buninotus Maldonado & Capriles, 1981
 Caprilesia Gil-Santana, Marques & Costa, 2006
 Gallobelgicus Distant, 1906
 Kiskeyana Weiruach & Forero, 2007
 Oncerotrachelus Stål, 1860
 Paratagalis Monte, 1943
 Polytoxus Spinola, 1840
 Pseudosaica Blinn, 1990
 Saica Amyot and Serville, 1843
 Saicireta Melo & Coscarón, 2005
 Tagalis Stål, 1860

The taxonomic position of the genus Saicella Usinger, 1958 is uncertain, with characters similar to both the subfamilies Saicinae and Emesinae.

External links

References

Reduviidae
Hemiptera subfamilies